Kamppi metro station is a station on the Helsinki Metro. In addition to serving the area around Kamppi in central Helsinki, the station is integrated with the Kamppi Center bus terminal and shopping complex. Kamppi is served by both lines M1 and M2.

The station was opened on 1 March 1983, designed by Eero Hyvämäki, Jukka Karhunen, and Risto Parkkinen. It was built with a secondary platform located perpendicularly under the one in use, reserved for a future metro extension. Like other underground metro stations in Helsinki, Kamppi metro station was designed to also serve as a bomb shelter.

A new eastern entrance, connecting directly to Kamppi Center, was opened on 2 June 2005.

Pictures

References

External links 

Helsinki Metro stations
Railway stations opened in 1983
1983 establishments in Finland
Kamppi